Ann-Marie Hermans is an Australian politician. She is a member of the Liberal Party and is a member of the Victorian Legislative Council, representing the South Eastern Metropolitan Region since November 2022. Upon election to the Legislative Council, she was appointed Shadow Minister for Emergency Services and Shadow Minister for WorkCover and the TAC in the Pesutto shadow cabinet. Before joining the Liberals, she ran for Family First at the 2006 Victorian state election.

Hermans was a school teacher prior to entering politics.

References

External links
Website

Politicians from Melbourne
Year of birth missing (living people)
Living people
Liberal Party of Australia politicians